Lutselk'e Water Aerodrome  is a seaplane base located at Łutselk'e, Northwest Territories on Great Slave Lake. It is open from mid-June until September. However, drifting ice may be encountered until July.

See also
 Lutselk'e Airport

References

Registered aerodromes in the North Slave Region
Seaplane bases in the Northwest Territories